Boiúna (translated as "Black Snake") is a mythological creature in Brazilian mythology. It is also known as the Cobra-Grande (translated as "Large Serpent") and the Mboiaçu.

Mythology
The Boiúna is a nocturnal black snake creature which is the most powerful creature of the rivers within the Amazon rainforest. It can take on various shapes in order to frighten away any fishermen that enter its territory. Some of the forms the Boiúna can take on are a canoe, a sailboat, a transatlantic, and a woman.

In popular culture
 The Boiúna appears in The River. Initially, it was portrayed as an uncharted stretch of the Amazon river that curves through the jungle like a snake's coils, and it's home to all manners of paranormal occurrences: “The further we go up the Boiúna, the further the laws of physics breaks down” as one character states. Later, it is revealed that the Boiúna is actually the evil life force of the river itself, and the series ends with the very river changing shape to prevent the characters from leaving, trapping them in the jungle for all eternity.
 The Boiúna also appears in AdventureQuest Worlds. This version of the Boiúna is a recolored version of Snake. It is among the creatures that attack Terra da Festa before the Carnaval Party.

External links
 Boiúna at Itanheim Virtual
 Boiúna at Blogspot

Brazilian legendary creatures
Fictional snakes
Legendary serpents
Indigenous Amazonian legendary creatures